Jałocha or Jalocha is a Polish surname. It may refer to: 
 Jan Jałocha (born 1957), Polish footballer
 Konrad Jałocha (born 1991), Polish footballer
 Marcin Jałocha (born 1971), Polish footballer

See also
 

Polish-language surnames